Reiff may refer to:

Places
Germany
Reiff (Rhineland-Palatinate), a municipality

Italy
Riva del Garda, in Trentino-Alto Adige/Südtirol

United Kingdom
Reiff, Ross-shire, Scotland, a crofting and fishing village

United States
Reiff, California, a former settlement
Reiff's Antique Gas Station Automotive Museum, California
Reiff Farm, a historic farm in Pennsylvania

People
Charles Reiff (1940–1964), Luxembourgian boxer
Ethan Reiff, American American screenwriter and producer
Fritz Reiff (1888–1953), German stage and film actor
Gaston Reiff (1921–1992), Belgian athlete
Joe Reiff (1911–1988), American basketball player
Johann Gottfried Reiff, German philologist
Lester Reiff (1877–1948), American jockey
Marion Reiff (born 1979), Austrian diver
Patricia Reiff, Space scientist
Rick Reiff (born 1952), American Pulitzer Prize-winning journalist
Riley Reiff (born 1988), American football player
Rudolf Reiff (1901–1961), German actor
Ryszard Reiff (1923–2007), Polish politician, lawyer and resistance fighter
Søren Reiff (born 1962), Danish guitar player, producer, composer and author

See also
Reif

Occupational surnames